Uchchaith is a village in Madhubani District, Bihar, India. There is a temple of the Goddess Durga without head known as Uchchaith Bhagwati in this village. It is said that many legendary Maharishis have passed through Uchchaith during their journey to the Himalayas or on their way to Janakpur, the capital of Mithila.  These include many sages like Maharishi Kapila, Kaṇāda, Gautam, Gemini, Pundarik, Lomas, etc.

History 

According to history, the poet Kālidāsa was  blessed with all knowledge by Durga, she was impressed by his devotion and dedication. Kalidasa lived here for several years. According to a legend famous in the this area, there was a Sanskrit college in ancient times, which is still present there. It is said that kalidasa lived there as a servant of the college. There was a river known as Thumhani between the college and the temple. One day due to heavy rains there was a dangerous flood in the river. Students of that college said Kalidasa to cross the river at evening  to lightening a candle  for goddess Durga temple which was another side of college which could be reached after crossing river. They also asked Kalidasa to mark anything by which people could believe that he had lightened the candle . Kalidasa crossed the river and burnt a candle. After that due to lack of knowledge, he started marking  on Goddess face by black colour. It is said that at that time Goddess Durga appeared and stopped Kalidasa hand and told Kalidasa "You are so foolish that you don't know what is right and wrong." Then goddess asked Kalidasa to seek any boon and  anything which he wanted , because Kalidasa was devotee of goddess Durga. Kalidasa seek only knowledge then the Goddess blessed him that whatever book  you would touch tonight you would have knowledge of that book . Due to blessings of Goddess Durga, Kalidasa became a great poet and author of many books and literature and became national poet of india.

Description 
Uchchaith Durgasthan is counted among the Shakti Peetha, so people come here for Tantric achievements.The idol of the goddess is carved on a black stone. Only the shoulder portion of the mother is visible. She is also known as Chinnamastika Durga due to not having a head. There used to be a cremation ground around the pond near the temple.  Even today Tantra seekers come here and do penance.

Electoral Constituency

Benipatti (Vidhan Sabha Constituency)

Local Language
Maithili

References

Villages in Madhubani district